Audubon is one of a pair of Greek Revival houses built across from each other on Moore's Mill Pike in Scott County, Kentucky. The property was added to the U.S. National Register of Historic Places on December 4, 1973.

History
In 1829, Charles B. Lewis bought farm land on Moore's Mill Pike from James Stephenson and built a Greek Revival style house on the property.

References

Houses completed in 1892
National Register of Historic Places in Scott County, Kentucky
Houses in Scott County, Kentucky
Houses on the National Register of Historic Places in Kentucky
1829 establishments in Kentucky
Greek Revival houses in Kentucky